This is a list of holidays in Dominican Republic.

Public holidays 
 January 1: New Year's Day, national holiday 
 January 6: Epiphany (Dia de Los Reyes), national holiday
 January 21: Our Lady of High Grace, national holiday
 January 26: Duarte's Birthday, national holiday
 February 27: Independence Day, national holiday
 Friday of Holy Week, March or April: Good Friday, national holiday
 May 1: Labour Day, national holiday
 Second Thursday after Pentecost, May or June: Corpus Christi, national holiday
 August 16: Restoration Day, national holiday
 September 24: Our Lady of Mercy (Nuestra Senora de las Mercedes), national holiday
 November 6: Constitution Day, national holiday
 December 25: Christmas Day, national holiday

References 

 
Dominican Republic
Holidays